Wherwell Abbey was an abbey of Benedictine nuns in Wherwell, Hampshire, England.

Foundation
The nunnery was founded about 986 by Ælfthryth, the widow of King Edgar. She retired there to live a life of penance for her part in the murders of her first husband Æthelwald and of her step-son King Edward. She died at the monastery on 17 November 1002 and was buried there.

It would seem that immediately after the foundress's death, King Æthelred confirmed by charter all his mother's gifts to the abbey, where the abbess was then Heanfied. The grant included exemption from temporal service, and the gift of land and houses at Edelingdene, Winchester and Bullington.

An unnamed granddaughter of Ælfthryth (and daughter of King Æthelred the Unready) was abbess in the eleventh century.

According to the Annals of Winchester and Florence of Worcester, King Edward the Confessor's mother, Emma, and his wife Edith were both confined for a period at Wherwell, but it seems likely that this assertion is confused and that Emma was never sent to Wherwell.

The Domesday Book records the abbey's property as comprising the vills of Wherwell, Tufton Goodworth, Little Anne, Middleton, Bullington, and houses in Winchester, all in Hampshire. The annual revenue then amounted to £14. 10s.

Later history
During the Anarchy in 1141, the Empress Matilda's forces fortified the abbey, but they were defeated by King Stephen's troops. Matilda's men fled into the abbey, which was then burned by Stephen's troops commanded by William of Ypres.  Traces of the earthworks built by the Empress Matilda's forces are visible today.

In about 1173 Matilda de Bailleul (aka Maud) arrived from Flanders. She made good on the damage done by William of Ypres. She organised a funding system for the abbey establishing four prebends. Thomas Becket had been murdered in 1170 and after he died the abbey had a silver goblet and a gilded chalice that were noted because they had been used by revered Thomas a Becket. As the abbey had no relics it is speculated that these drinking vessels were used to attract funding. Matilda is said to have installed lighting as well as ornaments in the abbey.

On 21 May 1194 the pope Celestine III wrote to de Bailleul and the nuns at the Abbey, acknowledging the reversal in the abbey's fortunes. By then the abbess had had a psalter in her possession which is believed to have been made by two scribes and an artist associated with St Albans Abbey in Hertfordshire. She added details to the psalter of her relatives obituaries and prayers.

Matilda died in 1212 and by that time the number of nuns had grown from not many to forty. Matilda was succeeded by her niece Euphemia de Walliers. Matilda's psalter was passed down to her spiritual successors who also added annotations. The psalter is now in the possession of St John's College, Cambridge. Euphemia was Matilda's niece and she also came from Flanders. She would serve as Abbess until 26 April 1257.

Euphemia seems to have been a veritable whirlwind. Events include many undated charters relating to small gifts or grants was made. Like Matilda (Maud?), she seems to have been well loved by the nuns, as the surviving cartulary records. Euphemia built a new farmery, dorter and areas for other functions, such as latrines with running water, all away from the main buildings, and nearby a chapel of the Blessed Virgin, with a large enclosed garden. By the river bank, she constructed other practical buildings, but left access to the river for the nuns. She cleared sordid older buildings that were a fire risk and built a new hall for the manor court, and further away a new and efficient mill She rebuilt from the ground up the dilapidated manor house at Middleton, and took similar measures at Tufton. She was attentive to charitable works and in providing hospitality.

She embellished the Norman church that had replaced the original Saxon church after the Conquest with crosses, reliquaries, precious stones, vestments, and books. When the decaying bell tower collapsed on to the dorter in the early hours, narrowly missing the nuns, she built a tall and handsome replacement that matched the remaining buildings and in her old age she had dismantled and rebuilt with 12-foot deep foundations the sanctuary of the church.

Abbess Euphemia also oversaw a significant expansion in the size of the community with the number of nuns being housed reaching 80. The Black Death later cut this number to single figures.

In 1291 the temporalities of the Wherwell Abbey were valued at a very considerable £201 18s. 5½d., in addition to which the abbess received pensions of £1 10s. from the church of Wallop and £1 6s. 8d. from the church of Berton.

That same year, on 12 August, Pope Nicholas IV granted a relaxation of one year and forty days to penitents practising imposed penance who visited the Abbey church of Wherwell, on the four feasts of the Blessed Virgin, and on that of the Holy Cross and its octave.

In larger monastic houses of both men and women, the sacristan held a highly responsible post and at Wherwell was the beneficiary of specific income from dedicated rents. During the time of another abbess Maud (1333-1340) an inventory of the valuables in the sacristan’s custody was compiled. It detailed two precious chalices donated by Abbess Maud herself and Abbess Ellen de Percy and nine other chalices, several for use on a specific altar, two with depictions of St Thomas Becket on the foot, a number of silver and silver gilt ciboria and pyxes to hold the sacred hosts, one in the form of a tower. There were also crosses, basins, cruets for wine and water, candlesticks, censers, incense boats with their spoons, and two crowns (perhaps for crowning a statue of the Virgin), all in silver or silver gilts. This indicates not idle riches, but a certain level of income plus an attention to the dignity of the liturgical services as already seen a century earlier under Abbess Euphemia.

Other burials
Benjamin Lethieullier
Cecily Shirley West, wife of Thomas West, 3rd Baron De La Warr

Dissolution
After having been in substance harassed for some years, the abbey was left with no option but to surrender at the Dissolution of the monasteries to the crown on 21 November 1539. The abbess received an annual pension of £40, the prioress one of £6, and twenty-three nuns received pensions of from £5 to £2 13s. 4d.

Post-dissolution
It was originally intended that the site and estates be granted to John Kingsmill, brother of the abbess, but in fact they were granted to Thomas West, 9th Baron De La Warr, after he successfully petitioned Cromwell for it. The manor house of Wherwell Priory was built on the site.

Present day
The abbey has disappeared, but in 1997 a geophysical survey by archaeologists from Southampton University located the foundations under the lawn of the eighteenth-century Wherwell Priory.

Notes

Benedictine monasteries in England
Benedictine nunneries in England
Anglo-Saxon monastic houses
Abbeys in Hampshire
986 establishments
1539 disestablishments in England
10th-century establishments in England
Christian monasteries established in the 10th century